Short track speed skating at the 2023 Winter World University Games was held at the 1932 Jack Shea Arena from 19 to 21 January 2023.

Medal summary

Men

Women

Mixed

Medal table

Participating nations
A total of 23 nations competed:

  (1)
  (1)
  (10)
  (10)
  (4)
  (2)
  (5)
  (4)
  (2)
  (1)
  (2)
  (10)
  (10)
  (1)
  (3)
  (5)
  (1)
  (1)
  (7)
  (3)
  (1)
  (4)
  (10)

References

External links
Short track speed skating lakeplacid2023.com
Results book

2023 Winter World University Games
2023
Winter World University Games
2023 Winter World University Games